The Lloyd Tilghman House is an historic home located in downtown Paducah, Kentucky, United States.  It is also known as the Tilghman-Woolfolk House and the Lloyd Tilghman House and Civil War Museum.

Early years
The Greek Revival house was built in 1852 by Robert Woolfolk on the behalf of Lloyd Tilghman, who had just moved with his family to Paducah that year.  Tilghman was a West Point graduate, having finished 46th out of 49 in his class, but spent less than a year as a Second Lieutenant.  He moved to Paducah, then a community of 3,000 people, due to being assigned there by his employer, the New Orleans and Ohio Railroad, as a railroad civil engineer for the first railroad to connect Paducah to major cities to the south.  Tilghman did not purchase the house; Woolfolk remained the owner of the property.  Tilghman and his wife, seven children, and five slaves called the residence home until 1861, although Tilghman spent much of his time working on a railroad in the Isthmus of Panama. At the time of his departure from the home, he was one of two colonels of the Kentucky State Guard whose stated purpose was to defend the state's neutrality.  He officially left Paducah in June 1861, delaying his departure to prevent more pro-Union officers from leading the state militia in Paducah.

Woolfolk's family then moved into the home.  When Federal troops finally arrived in Paducah, their headquarters were directly across from the Woolfolk home.  Woolfolk was pro-Southern and flew a Confederate flag in response, sparking a riot in December 1861 that included Union soldiers, particularly those of the 11th Indiana Regiment.  The incident would begin Brigadier General Charles Ferguson Smith's decline as he saw his subordinate, Ulysses S. Grant, raised above him almost immediately.

Woolfolk was banished from Paducah and the United States to Canada on August 1, 1864, by Union Brigadier General Eleazer A. Paine.  Two weeks later his wife and family were also banished to Canada, which resulted in eight of Woolfolk's household, four others from Paducah, and eleven from Columbus, Kentucky following Woolfolk into exile.  These acts infuriated the Kentucky governor, and Paine was removed from command in Paducah after only 90 days.

Post-war

After the war the house was a residence until 1906, where it would see various commercial uses.  It was slated for demolition in August 1986, but after work by Growth, Inc. the building was saved.  In 1987 the roof was stabilized, and in 1992 it came under the care of the Tilghman Heritage Foundation.  A total of $150,000 was spent to save the building from 1986 to 1998.

It is now used as a Civil War Museum focusing on the western theater of the war.  Upon its grand reopening on March 25, 2006, the museum focused on Western Kentucky's role in the war.  On December 1, 2008, the Sons of Confederate Veterans purchased the home from the foundation, with each group paying half of the remaining $150,000 mortgage.  The museum is to keep its previous operation hours of noon to 4pm, Wednesday through Saturday, from March to November.

Gallery

References

External links
 Visiting information - City of Paducah

1852 establishments in Kentucky
American Civil War museums in Kentucky
Buildings and structures in Paducah, Kentucky
Historic house museums in Kentucky
Houses completed in 1852
Houses in McCracken County, Kentucky
Houses on the National Register of Historic Places in Kentucky
Museums in McCracken County, Kentucky
National Register of Historic Places in McCracken County, Kentucky
Tilghman family
Greek Revival architecture in Kentucky
Sons of Confederate Veterans